Cuddy may refer to:


Places in the United States
 Cuddy, Pennsylvania, an unincorporated community
 Cuddy Valley, California
 Cuddy Canyon, California

People and fictional characters
 Cuddy (surname)
 Edward Aburrow Sr. (1714/1715–1763), English cricketer and reported smuggler under the alias Cuddy

Other uses
 Cuddy (cabin), a small cabin or cupboard, especially on a boat

See also

Caddy (disambiguation)
 St Cuthbert's Cave, also known as Cuddy's Cave, Northumberland, England
 Cutty (disambiguation)